Jonas Staugaitis (May 20, 1868, Omentiškiai, Suwałki Governorate – January 18, 1952, Kaunas) was the acting President of Lithuania during the December 1926 coup d'état. He was formally elected for a few hours as the Speaker of the Seimas; as the highest-ranked official, he also became the de jure President of Lithuania. He renounced the office after the coup d'état was complete.

He was a doctor, having studied at the Warsaw University. In 1919, he was elected to the Seimas (Lithuanian parliament) as a member of the Lithuanian Popular Peasants' Union. On June 2, 1926, he was elected the speaker of Seimas.

He is buried in the Petrašiūnai cemetery in Kaunas.

References

External links
STAUGAITIS Jonas (1868–1952) 

1868 births
1952 deaths
Lithuanian physicians
People from Suwałki Governorate
People from Vilkaviškis District Municipality
Presidents of Lithuania
Speakers of the Seimas
Burials at Petrašiūnai Cemetery